The Church of Our Blessed Lady of the Sablon is a Roman Catholic church located in the Sablon/Zavel district, in the historic centre of Brussels, Belgium. It is dedicated to Our Lady of the Sablon.

Built in the 15th century, the church was patronised by the nobility and wealthy citizens of Brussels, and is characterised by its late Brabantine Gothic exterior and rich interior decoration including two Baroque chapels. Its neo-Gothic decorative elements date from the 19th century. The complex was designated a historic monument in 1936.

The church is located along the /, halfway between the Place Royale/Koningsplein and the Palace of Justice, not far for the Royal Museums of Fine Arts and across the street from the Square du Petit Sablon/Kleine Zavelsquare. This site is served by the tram stop / (on lines 92 and 93).

History

Origins
The church's history goes back to the early 13th century when the Duke of Brabant, Henry I, recognised the Noble Serment of Crossbowmen as a guild and granted them certain privileges, including the right to use a plot at the Sablon/Zavel (a piece of sandy clay land outside the city walls) as an exercise ground. Nearly a century later, in 1304, the Guild of the brothers and sisters of Saint John's Hospital ceded to the Crossbowmen's Guild an area adjacent to the Sablon where the Guild proceeded to build a modest chapel dedicated to Our Lady. This chapel became that of the Crossbowmen's Guild.<ref name="sc">[http://historiek.net/onze-lieve-vrouw-ter-zavelkerk-in-brussel/8925/ Rudi Schrever, Onze-Lieve-Vrouw-ter-Zavelkerk in Brussel''']' </ref>

Legend has is that the chapel became famous after a local devout woman named Beatrijs Soetkens had a vision in which the Virgin Mary instructed her to steal the miraculous statue of Onze-Lieve-Vrouw op 't Stocxken ("Our Lady on the little stick") in Antwerp, bring it to Brussels, and place it in the chapel of the Crossbowmen's Guild. The woman stole the statue, and through a series of miraculous events, was able to transport it to Brussels by boat in 1348. It was then solemnly placed in the chapel and venerated as the patron of the Guild. The Guild also promised to hold an annual procession, called an Ommegang, in which the statue was carried through Brussels. This Ommegang developed into an important religious and civil event in Brussels' annual calendar.

Construction
The construction of the church, which replaced the chapel, is generally believed to have started around 1400. The whole construction process took about a century. The choir was finished in 1435, as testified by mural paintings of that date. The works were interrupted because of the troubles after the death of Charles the Bold in 1477, but restarted by the end of the century. The nave was built with seven bays, the last two of which should have been surmounted by a tower that was never completed. The sacrarium built behind the choir dates from 1549.

At the end of the 16th century, the church was sacked by Calvinists and the Virgin's statue that Beatrijs Soetkens had brought was destroyed. In the 17th century, the prominent family of Thurn und Taxis, whose residence was located almost opposite the church's southern entrance, had two chapels built inside it: the Chapel of St. Ursula (1651–1676), situated north of the choir, started by the Flemish sculptor-architect Lucas Faydherbe and completed by Vincent Anthony; and the Chapel of Saint Marcouf (1690), situated south of the choir.

At the beginning of the French occupation in 1795, the church was saved from the anti-religious zeal of the occupiers and their supporters thanks to the priest swearing allegiance to the Republic. The church remained closed for a few years and was returned to religious service under Napoleon, as a subsidiary of the Chapel Church.

Renovation

Soon after the completion of the final section of the / in 1872, the buildings that had been built against the church were removed. The church appeared so dilapidated after this removal that restoration works were launched immediately.

The first works were entrusted, in 1870, to the local architect Auguste Schoy. He proposed a restoration project that was so radical that the Commission of Monuments at first refused to endorse it because it was considered too fanciful. Schoy's intervention was restricted to rather modest works: rehabilitation of the side aisles on the Rue de la Régence; reopening of the pointed arch windows on the side of the /, which had been walled up in the 18th century for the installation of organs; and replacing the rose window of the north portal with a pointed arch window.

The site was then entrusted to the Belgian architect Jules-Jacques Van Ysendijck and then to his son Maurice. Jules-Jacques van Ysendijck was a disciple of Eugène Viollet-le-Duc and led the work in accordance with the latter's principle of unity of style. From 1895 to 1912, he and his son implemented six construction phases by which they created a monument that had never existed. They added turrets, pinnacles and openwork balustrades, covered the aisles with perpendicular gables instead of the continuous gables parallel to the nave, and built buttresses with pinnacles.

From 1917 to 1937, the architect François Malfait directed the placement of 57 statues from 27 different sculptors. The church was designated a historic monument on 5 March 1936. More recently, the City of Brussels undertook a global restoration to bring back the church to its former glory. The entire restoration lasted fourteen years.

Description
Most of the church is in the Brabantine Gothic style, although some parts are in the newer Baroque style. It is traditionally listed, alongside the Cathedral of St. Michael and St. Gudula and the Chapel Church, as one of the three Gothic churches still standing in central Brussels.

Interior

Nave and choir
Striking features of the nave are the pillars that have no capital, contributing to the verticalising effect. The columns of the nave hold twelve statues of apostles, dating from the mid 17th century, which were sculpted by some of the leading Baroque sculptors of that time. The triforium is remarkable for its rhythmic vesica piscis motifs.

The polychrome murals in the choir date from the first half of the 15th century. There is a magnificent triptych of the Flemish painter Michiel Coxie on The Resurrection of Christ, as well as a Beheading of Barbara'', formerly attributed to Erasmus Quellinus, but now attributed to Gaspar de Crayer. The stained glass windows are relatively recent and largely the work of the artists ,  and Jacques Colpaert.

The Baroque pulpit is a work of Marc de Vos, executed in 1697 for the Temple of the Augustinians in Brussels, which no longer exists. It is decorated with medallions of Saint Thomas Aquinas, the Virgin Mary and Saint Thomas of Villanova. The base on which the pulpit rests is formed by four sculptures symbolising the Evangelists: the angel, the eagle, the lion and the ox. The church houses several Baroque funeral monuments. The church holds other treasures such as the reliquary with the bones of Saint Wivina.

Baroque chapels

The church is best known for its two magnificent Baroque chapels, which the Thurn und Taxis family had built on both sides of the choir in the second half of the 17th century. One chapel is dedicated to Saint Ursula and was designed by Lucas Faydherbe. It contains ornate sculptures by Gabriël Grupello, Mattheus van Beveren, Jerôme Duquesnoy (II) and Jan van Delen. The other chapel is dedicated to Saint Marcuf, who is, amongst others, the patron saint of the pharmacists and drapers. The two chapels are excellent examples of the High Baroque sculpture and architecture that developed in the Southern Netherlands.

Directly opposite the church, there is a memorial plaque on the location where the Thurn und Taxis family had their residence, and as imperial postmasters, founded the first international postal service in 1516.

Burials 
 Ferdinand van Boisschot
 Claude Bouton, Lord of Corbaron
 Ernest du Baillet

See also

 List of churches in Brussels
 Roman Catholicism in Belgium
 History of Brussels
 Belgium in "the long nineteenth century"

References

Notes

Roman Catholic churches in Brussels
City of Brussels
Protected heritage sites in Brussels
Gothic architecture in Belgium
15th-century Roman Catholic church buildings in Belgium
Roman Catholic churches completed in 1435
Order of the Holy Sepulchre